Tantilla is a large genus of harmless New World snakes in the family Colubridae. The genus includes 66 species, which are commonly known as centipede snakes, blackhead snakes, and flathead snakes.

Description
Tantilla are small snakes, rarely exceeding 20 cm (8 inches) in total length (including tail). They are generally varying shades of brown, red or black in color. Some species have a brown body with a black head.

Behavior
Tantilla are nocturnal, secretive snakes. They spend most of their time buried in the moist leaf litter of semi-forested regions or under rocks and debris.

Diet
The diet of snakes of the genus Tantilla consists primarily of invertebrates, including scorpions, centipedes, spiders, and various insects.

Species
Tantilla albiceps Barbour, 1925 – Barbour's centipede snake – Panama
Tantilla alticola (Boulenger, 1903) – Boulenger's centipede snake – Nicaragua, Costa Rica, Panama, Colombia
Tantilla andinista Wilson & Mena, 1980 – Andes centipede snake – Ecuador
Tantilla armillata Cope, 1876 – Costa Rica, El Salvador, Guatemala, Honduras, Nicaragua, Panama

Tantilla atriceps (Günther, 1895) – Mexican blackhead snake – USA (Arizona, Texas, New Mexico), northern Mexico
Tantilla bairdi Stuart, 1941 – Baird's black-headed snake – Guatemala
Tantilla berguidoi Batista, Mebert, Lotzkat & Wilson, 2016 – Chucantí centipede snake – Panama
Tantilla bocourti (Günther, 1895) – Bocourt's black-headed snake – Mexico
Tantilla boipiranga Sawaya & Sazima, 2003 – Brazil
Tantilla brevicauda Mertens, 1952 – Mertens' centipede snake – El Salvador
Tantilla briggsi Savitzky & H.M. Smith, 1971 – Briggs' centipede snake – Mexico
Tantilla calamarina Cope, 1876 – Pacific Coast centipede snake – Mexico
Tantilla capistrata Cope, 1876 – Capistrata centipede snake – Peru
Tantilla carolina Palacios-Aguilar, Fucsko, Jiménez-Arcos, Wilson, & Mata-Silva, 2022 – Carolina’s little snake – Mexico
Tantilla cascadae Wilson & Meyer, 1981 – Michoacán centipede snake – Mexico
Tantilla ceboruca Canseco-Márquez et al., 2007 – Mexico
Tantilla coronadoi Hartweg, 1944 – Guerreran centipede snake – Mexico
Tantilla coronata Baird & Girard, 1853 – southeastern crowned snake – southeastern United States
Tantilla cucullata Minton, 1956 – Big Bend blackhead snake – USA (Texas), Mexico
Tantilla cuniculator H.M. Smith, 1939 – Peten centipede snake – south Mexico, Belize, Guatemala
Tantilla deppei (Bocourt) – Deppe's centipede snake – Mexico
Tantilla excelsa McCranie & E.N. Smith, 2017 – Honduras
Tantilla flavilineata H.M. Smith & Burger, 1950 – yellow-lined centipede snake – Mexico
Tantilla gottei McCranie & E.N. Smith, 2017 – Honduras
Tantilla gracilis Baird & Girard, 1853 – flathead snake – southwestern United States, northern Mexico
Tantilla hendersoni Stafford, 2004 – Peten centipede snake – Belize
Tantilla hobartsmithi Taylor, 1936 – southwestern blackhead snake – southwestern United States, northern Mexico
Tantilla impensa Campbell, 1998 – Guatemala
Tantilla insulamontana Wilson & Mena, 1980 – mountain centipede snake – Ecuador
Tantilla jani (Günther, 1895) – Jan's centipede snake – Mexico, Guatemala
Tantilla johnsoni Wilson, Vaughn & Dixon, 1999 – Mexico
Tantilla lempira Wilson & Mena, 1980 – Mena's centipede snake – Honduras
Tantilla lydia Antúnez-Fonseca, Castro, España, Townsend & Wilson, 2020 – Honduras
Tantilla melanocephala (Linnaeus, 1758) – blackhead snake – Mexico, Central and South America.
Tantilla miyatai Wilson & Knight, 1987 – Ecuador
Tantilla moesta (Günther, 1863) – blackbelly centipede snake – Mexico, Guatemala, Belize
Tantilla nigra (Boulenger, 1914) – black centipede snake – Colombia
Tantilla nigriceps Kennicott, 1860 – plains blackhead snake – southwestern United States, northern Mexico
Tantilla oaxacae Wilson & Meyer, 1971 – Oaxacan centipede snake  Mexico
Tantilla olympia Townsend, Wilson, Medina-Flores & Herrera, 2013 – Honduras
Tantilla oolitica Telford, 1966 – rim rock crowned snake – USA (Florida)
Tantilla petersi Wilson, 1979 – Peters' blackhead snake
Tantilla planiceps (Blainville, 1835) – western blackhead snake – United States (California), northern Mexico
Tantilla psittaca McCranie, 2011 – Honduras
Tantilla relicta Telford, 1966 – Florida crowned snake – USA (Florida)
Tantilla reticulata (Cope, 1860) – reticulate centipede snake – Nicaragua, Costa Rica, Panama, Colombia
Tantilla robusta Canseco-Márquez, Mendelson & Gutiérrez-Mayén, 2002 – Mexico
Tantilla rubra Cope, 1876 – Big Bend blackhead snake – USA (Texas), Mexico
Tantilla ruficeps Cope, 1894 – Costa Rica, Nicaragua, Panama
Tantilla schistosa (Bocourt, 1883) – red earth centipede snake – Mexico, Belize, Guatemala, El Salvador, Honduras, Nicaragua, Costa Rica, Panama
Tantilla semicincta (A.M.C. Duméril, Bibron & A.H.A. Duméril, 1854) – ringed centipede snake – Panama, Colombia, Venezuela
Tantilla sertula Wilson & Campbell, 2000 – Mexico
Tantilla shawi Taylor, 1949 – Potosí centipede snake – Mexico
Tantilla slavensi Pérez-Higareda, H.M. Smith & R.B. Smith, 1985 – Slavens' centipede snake – Mexico
Tantilla stenigrammi McCranie & E.N. Smith, 2017 – Honduras
Tantilla striata Dunn, 1928 – striped centipede snake – Mexico
Tantilla supracincta (W. Peters, 1863) – banded centipede snake – Nicaragua, Costa Rica, Panama, Ecuador
Tantilla taeniata Bocourt, 1883 – Central American centipede snake – Mexico, Guatemala, Honduras, El Salvador, Nicaragua
Tantilla tayrae Wilson, 1983 – Volcán Tacaná centipede snake – Mexico
Tantilla tecta Campbell & E.N. Smith, 1997 – Guatemala
Tantilla tjiasmantoi (Koch & Venegas, 2016) – Tjiasmanto's centipede snake – Peru
Tantilla trilineata (W. Peters, 1880) – Brazilian three-lined centipede snake – Brazil
Tantilla triseriata H.M. Smith & P.W. Smith, 1951 – Mexican three-lined centipede snake – Mexico
Tantilla tritaeniata H.M. Smith & Williams, 1966 – three-banded centipede snake – Honduras
Tantilla vermiformis (Hallowell, 1861) – Hallowell's centipede snake – Nicaragua, Costa Rica, El Salvator
Tantilla vulcani Campbell, 1998 – Guatemala
Tantilla wilcoxi Stejneger, 1902 – Chihuahuan blackhead snake – USA (Arizona), northern Mexico
Tantilla yaquia H.M. Smith, 1942 – Yaqui blackhead snake – USA (Arizona, New Mexico), Mexico

Nota bene: A binomial authority in parentheses indicates that the species was originally described in a genus other than Tantilla.

References

Further reading
Baird SF, Girard CF (1853). Catalogue of North American Reptiles in the Museum of the Smithsonian Institution. Part I.—Serpents. Washington, District of Columbia: Smithsonian Institution. xvi + 172 pp. (Tantilla, new genus, p. 104).
Stebbins RC (2003). A Field Guide to Western Reptiles and Amphibians, Third Edition. The Peterson Field Guide Series. Boston and New York: Houghton Mifflin. xiii + 533 pp.  (paperback). (Genus Tantilla, pp. 397–399).
Wright AH, Wright AA (1957). Handbook of Snakes of the United States and Canada. Ithaca and London: Comstock. 1,105 pp. (in 2 volumes) (Genus Tantilla, p. 722; key species and subspecies of Tantilla, pp. 723–725).

External links

Illinois Natural History Amphibian and Reptile Collection

Colubrids
Snake genera
Taxa named by Charles Frédéric Girard
Taxa named by Spencer Fullerton Baird